The Volvo VN (also known as the Volvo VNL) is a heavy duty truck produced by the Swedish vehicle manufacturer Volvo Trucks. Initially developed in North America, it was introduced in 1996 as the second generation Volvo Class 8 tractor. For the 2004 model year the third generation model was introduced with a revised hood, headlamps, fairings and interior, and the VN was officially renamed VNL. Other models included the VNM (until 2017) and the VNR (from 2017).

The "L" in VNL signifies a long bonnet, compared to the medium-bonneted VNM and the regional VNR. Other parts of the model name (for example, VNL64T760) include the number of wheels and wheels driven ("64"), followed by a "T" for tractor, followed by a three-digit code for the cab style. The 300 cab is a day cab and the 400 is a short sleeper, with 640/660/740/760/780 representing various full sleeper cabs with flat or high roofs.

It was the first Volvo commercial vehicle to be assembled in the United States after the discontinuation of the WhiteGMC brand (although Volvo did not purchase the remainder of General Motors' interests in truck tractors until 1997, rechristening its U.S. truck division from Volvo GM to Volvo Trucks North America). It is currently available exclusively for the North American market.

In 2013 Volvo Trucks added the VNX, the highest model in the VN series.

2018 model
On July 11, 2017, Volvo Trucks launched the redesigned 2018 VNL series at the event in Greensboro, North Carolina. On September 25, 2017, the display of the new 2018 VNL series to a public audience occurred at the 1st annual North American Commercial Vehicle Show held in Atlanta, Georgia. The new design brought aerodynamic improvements, a new dashboard, and a reclining bunk in the sleeper.

Available engines are Volvo's D11 and D13, as well as the Cummins X15.

VNR Electric
In December 2020, Volvo launched the VNR Electric, a battery-electric version of the VN regional truck.

References

External links
Volvo VN

Vehicles introduced in 1996
Motor vehicles manufactured in the United States
Volvo Trucks vehicles